Report on the State of Germany (Italian: Rapporto delle cose dell' Alemagna) was a 1508 work by Niccolò Machiavelli. Ridolfi states in The Life of Niccolò Machiavelli that the report was written a day after Machiavelli's return to Florence and that this report was later worked into Ritrato dell cose della Francia e dell'Alemagna.

References

Further reading
Machiavelli [I Ritratti delle cose di Francia e d'Alemagna] Portrait de la France, portrait d'Allemagne. Porrentruy: Imprimerie Lithographie C. Frossard, 1944
 

1508 books
Books about Germany
Works by Niccolò Machiavelli